APP Automotive is a Dutch automotive company owned and operated by Aart Andriessen. It was formed in 1993 by Aart. APP Racing Engines is based in Weesp.

History
APP Automotive consists of two departments: a streetcar-department and the APP Racing Engines-department. Over the years they have been involved in several projects working with cars like: Porsche, Pagani, Ferrari and Corvette. 
In 1998 they started racing in the Ferrari-Porsche Challenge with a 993 Supercup Porsche. One year later they had won 8 races with the 993 GT2 EVO with David Hart as the driver. In 2000 and 2001 they competed in Spanish GT with Klaas Zwart and Nicolas Dalli. That same year they were also building the 996 GT2 twinturbo race car. In 2004 they built the engine commissioned by Toine Hezemans for the Pagani Zonda GT1-car. And in the winter of 2005 APP Racing Engines started the Corvette GT3 race car project also commissioned by Toine Hezemans. APP Racing Engines mapped the stock Chevrolet engine and Callaway Competition prepared the car. When it became clear that the engines were not reliable enough, APP started development to make the engine stronger and more reliable for the following seasons. The APP engine development program proved to be extremely successful and can be seen clearly from the results they achieved:

 2007 GT3 FIA European Champion
 2008 GT3 FIA European Champion
 2009 ADAC GT Masters  Champion
 2010 GT3 FIA European Champion
 2013 ADAC GT Masters  Champion
 2017 ADAC GT Masters  Champion

External links
 Official APP Racing Engines website
 Official APP Automotive website

Automotive companies of the Netherlands
Companies established in 1993